OAO Chelyabinsk Forge-and-Press Plant (abbreviated as OAO ChKPZ) is a machine building and automobile component manufacturing company based in Chelyabinsk, Russia.

Overview
The company's main products are special purpose vehicles such as dumpers, short loggers, timber trucks, pipe trucks and bolsters, as well as wheels for cars, trucks, trolleybuses, trailers and semi-trailers and for heavy hauler and road construction machinery. In addition, the company produces forgings and presses used in manufacture of pipeline armature, cars and trucks, special-purpose equipment, vehicles, railway transport.

Most of the Chelyabinsk Forge-and-Press Plant's products are sold in Russia and in the former republics of the USSR, as well as in countries of Europe, Africa, and Asia.

The company's stock is listed on the Russian Trading System, and it currently has about 3,000 employees. It has two associated companies - Garmoniya OOO and Uraldormash ZAO.

The American magazine Business Week praised the company in its article published on 7 May 2009, describing it as a showcase of efficiency. The magazine especially praised the abilities of the company's 26-year-old CEO Andrey Gartung.

References

External links
Company website

Mechanical engineering companies of Russia
Automotive companies of Russia
Manufacturing companies of the Soviet Union
Companies based in Chelyabinsk
Companies listed on the Moscow Exchange